Pietro Diego Ferrara (born 29 June 1954 in Chieti) is an Italian politician.

He is a member of the Democratic Party and ran for Mayor of Chieti at the 2020 Italian local elections, supported by a centre-left coalition. He was elected at the second round with 55.8% and took office on 8 October 2020.

See also
2020 Italian local elections
List of mayors of Chieti

References

1954 births
Living people
Mayors of places in Abruzzo
People from Chieti